The 2019 Valletta Cup, the inaugural edition of the Valletta Cup, was a Twenty20 cricket tournament held in Malta between 17 and 20 October 2019. The participating teams were the hosts Malta along with Czech Republic, Iceland and a Hungary XI. Matches played between Malta and the Czech Republic had official Twenty20 International (T20I) status, but because Iceland were not an Associate Member of the ICC and the selected Hungarian squad was not an official national side, matches involving either of these teams did not have T20I status. The matches were played at Marsa Sports Club in Marsa. The Hungarian XI won all of their round-robin matches and their semi-final, but were beaten by the Czech Republic in the final.

Squads

Round robin

Points table

Fixtures

Knockouts

Semi-finals

Final

References

External links
 Series home at ESPN Cricinfo

Associate international cricket competitions in 2019–20
Valletta Cup